= Prime contractor =

Prime contractor may refer to:

- Prime contractor (US Government), a specific term in the US law for contractors that work directly with the US government
- Prime contractor, a synonym of general contractor that works directly with an end customer
